William Thomas Larkin (March 31, 1923 – November 4, 2006) was a prelate of the Roman Catholic Church who served as bishop of the Diocese of St. Petersburg in Florida from 1979 to 1988.

Biography

Early life 
William Larkin was born in Mount Morris, New York, on March 31, 1923.  He attended St. Andrews and St. Bernard seminaries in Rochester, New York. He was ordained as a priest in Syracuse, New York, for the Diocese of St. Augustine on May 15, 1947, by Bishop Walter Foery.  

After his ordination, Larking served in a parish in Daytona Beach, Florida.  He then studied at the Angelicum University in Rome, where he became a roommate of the future Pope John Paul II. Larkin help him study English.  Larkin received a Doctor of Sacred Theology degree in 1949.

After returning from Rome in 1949, Larkin was assigned to work in the chancery of the Diocese of St Augustine.  In 1951, he became associate pastor of Holy Family Parish in North Miami. Florida. He was transferred in 1954 to become pastor of Christ the King Parish in Jacksonville, Florida.  Larkin became pastor in 1967 of St. Cecilia Parish in Clearwater, Florida, also serving as vicar general of the diocese.  After the death of Bishop Charles McLaughlin in 1978, Larkin served as interim administrator of the Diocese of St. Petersburg.

Bishop of St. Petersburg 
Larkin was appointed as the second bishop of St. Petersburg by John Paul II on April 18, 1979.  He was consecrated on May 27, 1979 by the pope in Saint Peter's Basilica in Rome. During Larkin's tenure as bishop, the diocese added 15 new parishes, three new schools, and a radio station (WBVM 90.5 FM).  He created new offices for African-American and Hispanic Catholics, along with an office for Catholics with disabilities. Larkin also worked on services for the needy and for those with HIV/AIDS, and was a strong advocate for ecumenicism.

Retirement and legacy 
On November 29, 1988, John Paul II accepted Larkin's resignation as bishop of St. Petersburg for health reasons. William Larkin died of leukemia in Clearwater, Florida, on November 4, 2006 at age 83.Bishop Larkin Catholic School in Port Richey, Florida is named in his honor, as is the Bishop W. Thomas Larkin Pastoral Center in St. Petersburgh.

References

Episcopal succession

People from Mount Morris, New York
1923 births
2006 deaths
Roman Catholic bishops of Saint Petersburg
20th-century Roman Catholic bishops in the United States
21st-century Roman Catholic bishops in the United States
Catholics from New York (state)